The 1938 Baltic Cup was held in Tallinn, Estonia at Kadrioru staadion on 3–5 September 1938. It was the tenth edition of the tournament and the last one before the Soviet occupation of the three Baltic countries. Estonia won the tournament with a win over Lithuania and a draw against Latvia.

Results

Statistics

Goalscorers

See also
Balkan Cup
Nordic Football Championship

References

External links
 Tournament overview at EU-Football.info

1938
1938–39 in European football
1938 in Lithuanian football
1938 in Latvian football
1938 in Estonian football
1938